Singing When We're Young is a 2013 Chinese youth film, produced by Andy Lau, is the director's debut of Liu Juan. The film was shortlisted in the "Asian Newcomer Award" unit of the 16th Shanghai International Film Festival, and won a special jury award. Released in China on July 4, 2013.

Plot
n 1997, the senior 3 class flower Dong Chirp (Zhang Hanyun) appeared to be a sensible girl, but her heart was rebellious. Her good sister, Han Xia, likes fashion design very much. She is straightforward and dare to do things on weekdays, but because of her burly figure, ordinary appearance, and the personality of the men, she is often laughed at by the boys around her. The melancholy school grass Xia Jinghan (ran Xu), school bully Luo Fan (dai Xu), as well as the fat little Xiaoqiang (Zhang Zheng), the sports boy Dawei (Li Xian) are the school's recognized friends. Facing the upcoming college entrance examination, they each looked forward to their future lives. Chiu's father died suddenly on her eighteenth birthday, but the birthday gift left to her became her permanent spiritual sustenance. Jing Han was righteous for others. Due to the divorce of his parents in his childhood, he and his grandmother lived together. Luo Fan is Jinghan's best buddy. They admire each other's chivalrous temperament, but the love between Jinghan and tweeting has caused the brothers to look back. The ordinary Han Xia has always lived in the shadow of a good sister's tweeting. The huge contrast between her teacher and classmates' attitude towards her and tweeting has caused a huge crisis of their friendship.

Cast
 Zhang Hanyun as Dong Jiujiu
 Ran Xu as Xia Jinghan/Hanhan 
 Dai Xu as Luo Fan
 Wu Yuyao as Han Xia
 Zhang Zheng as Xiaoqiang/Wet Crotch/Diaper
 Li Xian as Li Wei
 Ni Dahong as Jiujiu's father
 Wang Jinsong as school security guard
 Song Xiaoying as Xia Jinghan's grandmother
 Pan Jie as Dong Jiujiu's mother
 Wang Yanhui as Luo Fan's father
 Qi Long as Hunhun
 Li Qingke as Zhou Yunkai (student)
 Lu Qian as Xiaoke (student)
 Chris Babida as music judge

Reception
 Chinese Young Generation Film Forum 2013 for Best Actor - Xu Dai
 Shanghai International Film Festival 2013 for Asian New Talent Award - Juan Liu
 Asian New Talent Award for Best Film (nominee)

References

External links
 
 

2013 films
Chinese drama films
2013 drama films
2010s Mandarin-language films